Radde's shrew (Sorex raddei) is a species of mammal in the family Soricidae. It is found in Armenia, Azerbaijan, Georgia, Russia, and Turkey.

References

Sorex
Taxonomy articles created by Polbot
Mammals described in 1895
Taxa named by Konstantin Satunin